Ernawan Witarsa (born 3 March 1966) is an Indonesian sprinter. He competed in the men's 4 × 100 metres relay at the 1984 Summer Olympics.

References

1966 births
Living people
Athletes (track and field) at the 1984 Summer Olympics
Indonesian male sprinters
Olympic athletes of Indonesia
Southeast Asian Games medalists in athletics
Place of birth missing (living people)
Southeast Asian Games gold medalists for Indonesia
Competitors at the 1985 Southeast Asian Games
20th-century Indonesian people